William of Norwich (2 February 1132 –  22 March 1144) was an English boy whose disappearance and killing was, at the time, attributed to the Jewish community of Norwich. It is the first known medieval accusation against Jews of ritual murder.

William was an apprentice tanner who regularly came into contact with Jews and visited their homes as part of his trade. His murder remains unsolved; the local community of Norwich attributed the boy's death to the Jews, though the local authorities would not convict them for lack of proof. William was acclaimed as a saint in Norwich, with miracles attributed to him.

William's story was told in The Life and Miracles of St William of Norwich, a multi-volume Latin work by Thomas of Monmouth, a monk in the Norwich Benedictine monastery. Thomas started The Life in 1149/50; he completed volume seven by 1173. Augustus Jessopp (1823–1914), one of the editors of the first printed edition of Thomas' work, describes Thomas as belonging to the class of those who are "deceivers and being deceived."

The murder
Since most information about William's life comes from Thomas, it is difficult to distinguish the facts of the case from the story of martyrdom created around it by Thomas. He wrote that William was born on 2 February 1132 to a local couple and was apprenticed to a skinner and tanner of hides, often dealing with local Jews.

Shortly before his murder, William's mother was approached by a man who claimed to be a cook working for the Archdeacon of Norwich. He offered William a job in the Archdeacon's kitchens. William's mother was paid three shillings to let her son go. William later visited his aunt in the company of this man. His aunt was apparently suspicious, and asked her daughter to follow them after they left. They were then seen entering the house of a local Jew. This was the last time William was seen alive; it was Holy Tuesday.

On Holy Saturday, the twelve-year-old William's body was found in Mousehold Heath, part of Thorpe Wood, outside Norwich. A local nun saw the body, but did not initially contact anyone. A forester named Henry de Sprowston then came across it. He noted injuries which suggested a violent death and the fact that the boy appeared to have been gagged with a wooden teasel. William was wearing a jacket and shoes.

After consultation with the parish priest, it was decided to bury the body on Easter Monday. In the meanwhile, local people came to look at it, and William was recognised. The body was then buried at the murder site, and the following day, members of William's family, one of whom was the priest, Godwin Stuart, arrived to confirm the identity of the body. They exhumed it and then reburied it with proper ceremony.

William's family and their fellow English quickly blamed the local Jewish community for the crime and demanded justice from the ecclesiastical court of Bishop William de Turbeville. Members of the Jewish community were asked by the Bishop to attend the court and submit to a trial by ordeal, but the local Norman sheriff, John de Chesney, advised them that the ecclesiastical court had no jurisdiction over them, as they were not Christians.

He then took the Jews into protection in Norwich Castle. After the situation had calmed down, they returned to their homes. The issue was revived two years later, when a member of the Jewish community was murdered in an unrelated incident. King Stephen agreed to look into the matter, but later decided not to pursue it.

In the meanwhile, William's body had been moved to the monks' cemetery. Bishop de Turbeville and other members of the local clergy attempted to create a cultus around him as a Christian martyr, but this plan did not succeed. There was no evidence in the initial accusations against the Jews that the murder was related to religious activity of any kind, but as the cult developed, so did a story of how and why William was killed.

Thomas' version of events

Thomas of Monmouth arrived in Norwich around 1150. At the urging of the Bishop, he decided to investigate the killing by interviewing surviving witnesses. He also spoke to people whom he identified as "converted Jews" who provided him with inside information about events within the Jewish community. He wrote an Ecclesiastical Latin account of the crime in his book The Life and Miracles of St William of Norwich.

In his account of the murder, Thomas of Monmouth writes that "having shaved his head, they stabbed it with countless thornpoints, and made the blood come horribly from the wounds they made...some of those present ad judged him to be fixed to a cross in mockery of the Lord's Passion...” William's body was later said to have been found in Thorpe Wood with a crown of thorns atop his head.

Thomas of Monmouth's account hinges upon the testimony of a monk and former Jew named Theobald of Cambridge. Theobald alleged that the murder was a human sacrifice and that the "ancient writings of his fathers" required the yearly killing of a Christian. This was allegedly for two reasons: to one day return to the Holy Land during the Messianic Age and to punish Jesus Christ for the persecution that the Jewish people continued to experience at the hands of his followers. There is, however, no such commandment for human sacrifice anywhere in Jewish theology or religious literature. Theobald also alleged, however, that the murderers were not practitioners of Orthodox Judaism. The murder was instead ordered at Narbonne, by a cult leader who had declared himself to be the Jewish Messiah and who had cast lots to select where in Europe his followers were to commit the murder.

Thomas supports this claim by saying that one converted Jew told him that there was an argument over how to dispose of the body. He also says that a Christian servant woman glimpsed the child through a chink in a door. Another man is said to have confessed on his deathbed, years after the events, that he saw a group of Jews transporting a body on a horse in the woods.

Context

The Jews in Norwich
The Jewish community is thought to have been established in Norwich by 1135, only nine years before the murder (though one Jew called 'Isaac' is recorded in the Domesday Book of 1086). Most lived in a Jewish quarter or "Jewry", located in what is now the Haymarket and White Lion Street. The Jews were a French-speaking community, like the recently established Anglo-Normans, and were closely associated with them. The "Jewry" was very close to the Castle, a pattern seen in other English towns where Jews were under the protection of the Normans.

William and his family, on the other hand, were of Anglo-Saxon descent and several of his relatives were married priests following local tradition. Conflicts between local Anglo-Saxons and Normans may well have lent themselves to conspiracy theories regarding capital crimes by French-speaking Jews being covered up by French-speaking Normans. Tensions were particularly high during the reign of King Stephen when the murder occurred. Thomas of Monmouth alleges that the sheriff was bribed by the Norwich Jewish community to protect them.

There may also have been background conflicts between the cathedral, the sheriff and local people about rights in the city and suburbs. Thomas repeatedly invokes God as the sole source of justice for Anglo-Saxons against corrupt Norman sheriffs. He also claims that John de Chesney, the sheriff who protected the city's Jews, was later punished with internal bleeding.

Cult

The wish of the local clergy – in particular, of Bishop William de Turbeville, to establish a cultus may at least in part have been partly financially motivated. The Bishop encouraged Thomas of Monmouth to question local people and to write his book.

After being buried in the monk's cemetery, the body of William was moved to progressively more prestigious places in the church, being placed in the chapter house in 1150 and close to the High Altar in 1151. Thomas devotes most of his book not to the murder, but to the evidence for William's sanctity, including mysterious lights seen around the body itself and miraculous cures effected on local devotees. Thomas admits that some of the clergy, notably the Prior, Elias, were opposed to the cult on the grounds that there was little evidence of William's piety or martyrdom. Thomas promoted the claims by providing evidence of visions of William and miracles.

Historian Paul Dalton states that the cult of William was predominantly "protective and pacificatory" in character, having similarities to that of another child saint, Faith of Conques. Despite its origins, the cult itself was not associated with the promotion of anti-Jewish activity. The cult was a minor one even at its height. There is little evidence of a flourishing cult of William in Norwich – surviving financial records listing offerings made at his shrine at Norwich Cathedral suggest that, although its fortunes waxed and waned, for much of its history there were few pilgrims, although offerings continued to be made until at least 1521. A temporary boost to the shrine's popularity occurred after 1376, when William was adopted by the Norwich Peltier's Guild, whose annual service at the Cathedral included a child who played the part of William. There was also a scholars' guild dedicated to St William in the Norfolk town of Bishop's Lynn.

Images of William as a martyr were created for some churches, generally in the vicinity of Norwich. A panel of painted oak, depicting William and Agatha of Sicily, is in the collection of the Victoria and Albert Museum in London; William is shown holding a hammer and with three nails in his head. The panel was formerly part of a rood screen at the Norwich Church of St John Maddermarket. The screen was commissioned by Ralph Segrym (died 1472), a merchant who became a Member of Parliament and Mayor of Norwich.

William is depicted on the rood screens of a number of other Norfolk churches: St Mary's Church, Worstead and St John's Church, Garboldisham depict William holding nails; the screen in Holy Trinity Church, Loddon depicts William being crucified.

Aftermath
As a result of the feelings generated by the William ritual murder story and subsequent intervention by the authorities on behalf of the accused, the growing suspicion of collusion between corrupt sheriffs and nobles and Jews fuelled the general anti-Jewish and anti-Norman mood of the population. After Thomas of Monmouth's version of William's death circulated a number of other unsolved child murders were attributed to Jewish conspiracies, including Harold of Gloucester (d. 1168) and Robert of Bury (d. 1181). The best-known of these was Little Saint Hugh of Lincoln (d. 1255). This became known as the blood libel.

By the reign of Richard the Lionheart attitudes towards English Jews had become less tolerant. This, in conjunction with the increase in national opinion in favour of a Crusade, and the conflation of all non-Christians in the Medieval Christian imagination, led to the Jewish deputation attending the coronation of Richard in 1189 being attacked by the crowd. A widespread attack began on the Jewish population, leading to massacres of Jews at London and York.

The attacks were followed by others throughout England. When the Norman nobility of Norwich attempted to suppress these activities, the yeomanry and peasants revolted against the lords and attacked their supporters, especially Norwich's Jewish community. On 6 February 1190, the Jews who were found in their own houses at Norwich were killed; others had taken refuge in Norwich Castle.

During the development of Chapelfield, Norwich, in 2004 a well with the remains of the remains of at least 6 adults and 11 children was discovered. Analysis showed strong affinities to living Ashkenazi Jewish groups.

Hostility against Jews continued until, in 1290, Jews were expelled from England by King Edward I. Jews were not officially allowed to resettle in England until after 1655, when Lord Protector Oliver Cromwell commissioned the Whitehall Conference to debate the proposals made by Menasseh ben Israel. While the Conference reached no verdict, it is seen as the beginning of resettlement of the Jews in England.

Modern theories of the crime

The story of William's supposed martyrdom in a Jewish conspiracy persisted for many centuries. As late as 1853, the author Susan Swain Madders, in her book on the history of Norwich, attributes William's death to a murderous conspiracy of "the Jews, then the leading doctors, merchants and scholars of the day". She also repeats the story that they escaped punishment "by some clever monetary arrangement with the authorities".

Thomas of Monmouth's account of William's life was published in 1896 in an edition by Augustus Jessopp and M. R. James. James's introduction to the book is the first modern analysis of the evidence provided by Thomas. James notes that Thomas is keen to prove the truth of his version of events by citing witnesses to build up a consistent account. He argues that some testimonies seem to be pure invention, others are unreliable, but that some appear to describe real events, though facts are being manipulated to fit the story. James dismisses the claim of planned ritual murder as a fantasy, which only emerges some years after the crime, promoted by the convert Theobald, keen to ingratiate himself with the Christian community. Independent support is very flimsy, such as the servant who is supposed to have glimpsed a child through a crack in the door, but did not report this until interviewed by Thomas years later.

James suggests several possibilities: 1. an accident in the woods; 2. a murder by a Christian who arranged the scene to cast blame on Jews; 3. a murder by an unknown person that was blamed on Jews for reasons unrelated to the crime itself; 4. accidental or deliberate killing by a Jew that was then covered up by the Jewish community who feared they would all be blamed. James thinks that all these are possible, including that a "deranged or superstitious" Jew might have killed William in a quasi-ritual way. He says that the convert Theobald himself is a possible suspect.

In an 1897 review of James' book Joseph Jacobs in the Jewish Quarterly Review argued that William's own family were the most likely suspects, speculating that they had held a mock crucifixion over Easter during which William fell into a "cataleptic" trance and died as a result of burial. Jacobs argues that it would make no sense for Jews to hide the body in Thorpe Wood, as they would have had to carry it through the whole of the Christian part of the town to get there. According to a 2005 paper by Raphael Langham, Jacobs provided "no evidence" for his speculation about a family crucifixion.

In 1933 Cecil Roth argued that a different type of mock crucifixion may have led to the accusations against Jews, because of a masquerade involving the mock execution of Haman enacted by the Jews at Purim. In 1964 Marion Anderson developed this idea, combining it with Thomas's original arguments. She suggests that William had been told not to associate with Jews following one such masquerade; he was then kidnapped and tortured by the Jews to find out why they were being ostracised. He died as a result and the body was disposed of.

In 1967, Vivian Lipman argued that the murder was a sex crime, suggesting that Thomas's comment that William was wearing a "jacket" and "shoes" implied that the boy's body was naked below the waist. It was probably perpetrated by the man who represented himself as a cook, and had enticed William away from his family to commit the crime. This man was never identified by Thomas and disappears from the story without explanation.

In 1984, Gavin I. Langmuir endorsed Lipman's "sane" account, dismissing Anderson's theories and criticising both James' and Jacobs' speculations, adding that Theobald was an unlikely suspect as he appears to have been in Cambridge when the murder was committed. In 1988, Zefirah Rokeah revived James' suggestion that Theobald was the killer. In 1997, John McCulloh followed Lipman in arguing that it was a sadistic sex crime. Raphael Langham, writing in 2005, believed that Theobald was a disturbed individual with a hatred of his own community and thus the most likely killer.

In 2015, E. M. Rose's investigation of the subject, The Murder of William of Norwich received the 2016 Ralph Waldo Emerson Award of the Phi Beta Kappa Society for "a scholarly study that contributes significantly to interpretation of the intellectual and cultural condition of humanity" and was named a "Top Ten Book in History" by The Sunday Times. Rose points out that road robberies and kidnappings gone wrong were a frequent cause of death in the region during Stephen's reign, when the Crown struggled to safeguard the roads, and could offer another explanation of William's death.

See also

 Andreas Oxner
 Blood libel
 Little Saint Hugh of Lincoln
 Simon of Trent
 The Prioress's Tale
 Werner of Oberwesel

References

Bibliography

 fully discusses saint cults like that of William of Norwich in medieval England.

.
 Rose, E.M. (2015). The Murder of William Norwich: The Origins of the Blood Libel in Medieval Europe. Oxford University Press. .

Further reading 
 G. F. Warner. Book review of Jessopp and James' Life and Miracles in "The English Historical Review" for 1898
 Fordham University: the Jesuit University of New York. Medieval Sourcebook: Thomas of Monmouth; The Life and Miracles of William of Norwich 1173

External links 
.
.

1132 births
1144 deaths
12th-century English people
Antisemitic attacks and incidents in Europe
Antisemitism in England
Blood libel
Burials at Norwich Cathedral
Child sexual abuse in England
Christian child saints
Conspiracy theories in the United Kingdom
Folk Catholicism
Folk saints
History of Catholicism in England
Incidents of violence against boys
Jewish English history
Murdered English children
People from Norwich
People murdered in England
Unsolved murders in England